Mihajlo Cakić (Serbian Cyrillic: Михајло Цакић; born 27 May 1990) is a Serbian footballer.

Career

Club
On 9 June 2015, Cakić signed for Sheriff Tiraspol, leaving at the end of his contract on 5 December 2015.

On 2 July 2019, Cakić left FC Istiklol by mutual consent.

International
Cakić played for the Serbian national under-21 team at the Valeriy Lobanovskyi Memorial Tournament in 2011.

Career statistics

Club

Honours

Club
Istiklol
Tajik Supercup (1): 2019

References

External links

 
 
 
 

1990 births
Living people
Sportspeople from Leskovac
Serbian footballers
Association football midfielders
FK Zemun players
FK Čukarički players
FC Zorya Luhansk players
FC Slavia Mozyr players
OFK Beograd players
FC Sheriff Tiraspol players
FC Tiraspol players
FC Istiklol players
Ukrainian Premier League players
Moldovan Super Liga players
Serbian expatriate footballers
Expatriate footballers in Ukraine
Expatriate footballers in Belarus
Expatriate footballers in Moldova
Expatriate footballers in Tajikistan
Serbia under-21 international footballers
Serbia youth international footballers
FK Sinđelić Beograd players
Tajikistan Higher League players